Strictly Rhythm is an American house music record label.

History
Strictly Rhythm relaunched in 2007 after a five-year break, following a venture with Warner Music. The label made a number of its recordings available for digital download and signed new productions from Quentin Harris, Osunlade, Chocolate Puma, Dennis Ferrer, Dirty South and Bob Sinclar. Three years later, in November 2010, the label opened a London office.
  
Strictly Rhythm has offices in New York and London.

In January 2013, BMG Rights Management agreed to acquire the historic Strictly Rhythm recordings catalogue and publishing rights for an undisclosed amount. In October 2015, BMG purchased the Strictly Rhythm publishing catalogue outright.

Notable artists

References

External links
Official website

American record labels
Record labels established in 1989
House music record labels